Larry Harvey (January 11, 1948 – April 28, 2018) was an American artist, philanthropist and activist. He was the main co-founder of the Burning Man event, along with his friend Jerry James.

Early life
Born in San Francisco, Harvey grew up in Portland, Oregon, where he was raised in the Parkrose neighborhood. He graduated from Parkrose High School in 1966. After high School, he joined the army and served as a clerk stationed in Germany. He later attended Portland State University.

Burning Man

Burning Man started in 1986 on the evening of the summer solstice. An effigy of a man was taken to San Francisco's Baker Beach and set on fire.  A small crowd gathered and soon the burning of the man became an annual event.  Over the next four years the attendees grew to more than 800 people. In 1990, in collaboration with the SF Cacophony Society, the event moved to the Black Rock Desert, Nevada, and took place over Labor Day weekend.  From a three-day, 80-person "zone trip," Burning Man became an eight-day counter culture event with 70,000 participants from all over the world.

In 1997, six of the main organizers formed Black Rock City LLC to manage the event, with Harvey as the executive director, a position he held until his death. Harvey was also the president of the Black Rock Arts Foundation, a non-profit art grant foundation for promoting interactive collaborative public art installations in communities outside of Black Rock City.

Philosophy and activities
Larry Harvey was a voracious reader and was heavily influenced by works such as Bowling Alone: The Collapse and Revival of American Community by Robert Putnam, The Varieties of Religious Experience by William James, and the writings of Sigmund Freud.

He scripted and co-chaired/curated the Burning Man art department and its annual event theme. Harvey was the main spokesperson and political strategist for the Burning Man organization. He had been featured in such engagements as San Francisco's Grace Cathedral "Radical Ritual" with Alan Jones, the Oxford Student Union, Cooper Union in New York City, Harvard's International Conference on Internet and Society as a panelist, the Walker Art Center in Minnesota and the San Francisco Commonwealth Club, as well as many others.

Death
Harvey died on April 28, 2018, due to complications related to a stroke he had suffered earlier in the same month.  He was 70 years old.

References

External links

Burning Man 2016 Financial Highlights
Biography of Larry Harvey
Speeches and Lectures by Larry Harvey
Zpub - Larry Harvey quotes
Larry Harvey addresses 2007 Burning Man controversy
Larry Harvey talks about 2007 Burning Man aka Green Man
BURNcast - Talk with Black Rock City LLC principles: Larry Harvey, Maid Marian and Danger Ranger
 The First Year in the Desert, by Louis Brill
ABC News Video: "See What Burning Man Was Like in the 90’s," interview with Larry Harvey

1948 births
2018 deaths
Anti-consumerists
Artists from Portland, Oregon
Artists from San Francisco
Burning Man
Portland State University alumni
United States Army soldiers
Parkrose High School alumni